Kaan İnce (2 February 1970 - 13 August 1992) was a Turkish writer and poet.

Life 
İnce was born on 2 February 1970 in Ankara. He completed his elementary, middle and high school education in Ankara. In 1991 he graduated from Ankara University with a degree in sociology. İnce wrote poems, which were published in many magazines. His first poem was published in the daily Milliyet Art Young Poets corner.

Aged 22 years, he committed suicide on August 13, 1992 jumping from the window of his hotel room in Kadıköy, İstanbul.

References 

 

Suicides by jumping in Turkey
Turkish writers
Ankara University alumni
Turkish poets
1970 births
1992 suicides
People from Ankara
20th-century poets